Marcus Willoughby Owen (4 April 1935 – December 1987) was a Welsh professional snooker player.

Career
Before turning professional, Owen won the English Under-16 Championship in 1949, and reached the final in 1950. Owen also won the English Amateur Championship on four occasions, in 1958, 1959, 1967 and 1973.

His elder brother Gary was a professional snooker player, and Marcus followed him into the professional game in 1973, entering the 1974 World Championship. As an unknown quantity, Marcus was not expected to progress far; however, he beat Dennis Taylor and Maurice Parkin to set up a last-16 meeting with Gary. Gary held Marcus to 5–5 at one point, but could not prevent him from pulling away to reach the quarter-final with a 15–8 victory. There, Marcus faced Ray Reardon, but having recovered from 3–9 to 7–9, was eventually defeated 11–15.

Owen next played a quarter-final at the 1982 Welsh Professional Championship, which was itself an eight-man event. He lost his first match 0–6 to Cliff Wilson.

Owen had no further success in professional snooker, his last match being a 0–6 loss to Tony Chappel in the first round of the 1985 edition of the Welsh Professional Championship; having held 17th place in the inaugural world rankings in 1976, he had not occupied a position on the list since 1980.

He resigned as a professional player in 1987.

Personal life
Owen died in hospital in December 1987, under 'tragic circumstances'.

Performance and rankings timeline

Career finals

Amateur finals: 4 (3 titles)

References

1935 births
1987 deaths
Welsh snooker players
Sportspeople from Carmarthenshire